Lot 41 may refer to:

 Lot 41, Prince Edward Island, a township on Price Edward Island, Canada
 Lot 41, the sea kayak used for the first kayak crossing of the Tasman Sea